Pablo Cottenot was a 19th-century French astronomer and discoverer of a minor planet.

He worked at Marseille Observatory, but according to Édouard Stephan, Cottenot's astronomy career was brief. He is credited by the Minor Planet Center with the discovery of one minor planet, the outer main-belt asteroid 181 Eucharis, which he named for a nymph of the goddess Calypso.

References 
 

Discoverers of asteroids

19th-century French astronomers
Year of birth missing
Year of death missing
Scientists from Marseille